In geometry, the truncated trioctagonal tiling is a semiregular tiling of the hyperbolic plane. There are one square, one hexagon, and one hexadecagon (16-sides) on each vertex.  It has Schläfli symbol of tr{8,3}.

Symmetry

The dual of this tiling, the order 3-8 kisrhombille, represents the fundamental domains of [8,3] (*832) symmetry. There are 3 small index subgroups constructed from [8,3] by mirror removal and alternation. In these images fundamental domains are alternately colored black and white, and mirrors exist on the boundaries between colors.

A larger index 6 subgroup constructed as [8,3*], becomes [(4,4,4)], (*444). An intermediate index 3 subgroup is constructed as [8,3⅄], with 2/3 of blue mirrors removed.

Order 3-8 kisrhombille 

The order 3-8 kisrhombille is a semiregular dual tiling of the hyperbolic plane. It is constructed by congruent right triangles with 4, 6, and 16 triangles meeting at each vertex.

The image shows a Poincaré disk model projection of the hyperbolic plane.

It is labeled V4.6.16 because each right triangle face has three types of vertices: one with 4 triangles, one with 6 triangles, and one with 16 triangles. It is the dual tessellation of the truncated trioctagonal tiling which has one square and one octagon and one hexakaidecagon at each vertex.

Naming 
An alternative name is 3-8 kisrhombille by Conway, seeing it as a 3-8 rhombic tiling, divided by a kis operator, adding a center point to each rhombus, and dividing into four triangles.

Related polyhedra and tilings 
This tiling is one of 10 uniform tilings constructed from [8,3] hyperbolic symmetry and three subsymmetries [1+,8,3], [8,3+] and [8,3]+.

This tiling can be considered a member of a sequence of uniform patterns with vertex figure (4.6.2p) and Coxeter-Dynkin diagram .  For p < 6, the members of the sequence are omnitruncated polyhedra (zonohedrons), shown below as spherical tilings. For p > 6, they are tilings of the hyperbolic plane, starting with the truncated triheptagonal tiling.

See also 

 Tilings of regular polygons
 Hexakis triangular tiling
 List of uniform tilings
 Uniform tilings in hyperbolic plane

References
 John H. Conway, Heidi Burgiel, Chaim Goodman-Strass, The Symmetries of Things 2008,  (Chapter 19, The Hyperbolic Archimedean Tessellations)

External links 

 Hyperbolic and Spherical Tiling Gallery
 KaleidoTile 3: Educational software to create spherical, planar and hyperbolic tilings
 Hyperbolic Planar Tessellations, Don Hatch

Hyperbolic tilings
Isogonal tilings
Semiregular tilings
Truncated tilings